Olena Lavrenyuk (born 18 December 1985) is a Ukrainian actress.

Biography
Lavrenyuk was born on 18 December 1985 in Lviv. After graduating from secondary school # 53 in Lviv, she went to the capital Kyiv, where she studied at the Kyiv National I. K. Karpenko-Kary Theatre, Cinema and Television University.

Lavrenyuk was the host of the weather on the TV channel. She made her film debut in the film "13 Months" (2008). Among her other works in cinema, roles in films such as Synevyr (2012), "Ordering for One" (2012), "Alien" (2012) and others. The popularity of the actress came after her starring role in the film “DZIDZIO: Double Bass”.

Personal life
Lavrenyuk is married to film producer Serhiy Lavrenyuk and they have two daughters. She currently lives in Kyiv.

References

External links

1985 births
Living people
Actors from Lviv
Ukrainian film actresses
Ukrainian stage actresses
Ukrainian television actresses
20th-century Ukrainian actresses
21st-century Ukrainian actresses